John E. Bennett may refer to:

 John E. Bennett (judge) (1833–1893), Arkansas Supreme Court Justice and South Dakota Supreme Court Justice
 John E. Bennett (scientist) (born 1933), American physician and scientist

See also
 John Bennett (disambiguation)